The Women's time trial of the 2017 UCI Road World Championships was a cycling event that took place on 19 September 2017 in Bergen, Norway. Annemiek van Vleuten of the Netherlands won the event.

Qualification
All National Federations were allowed to enter four riders for the race, with a maximum of two riders to start. In addition to this number, the outgoing World Champion and the current continental champions were also able to take part.

Participating nations
54 cyclists from 34 nations took part in the women's time trial. The number of cyclists per nation is shown in parentheses.

Final classification
All 54 competitors completed the -long course.

References

External links
Time trial page at Bergen 2017 website

Women's time trial
UCI Road World Championships – Women's time trial
2017 in women's road cycling